Regola is the 7th  of Rome, Italy, identified by the initials R. VII, and belongs to the Municipio I. The name comes from  (the name is recognizable in the modern Via Arenula), which was the name of the soft sand ( in Italian) that the river Tiber left after the floods, and that built strands on the left bank.

The seal of the  represents a rampant deer with a turquoise background.

History 
During the Roman empire, the area belonged to the Campus Martius. In particular, in the modern Regola there was the Trigarium, the stadium where the riders of the triga (a cart with three horses) used to train.

When Emperor Augustus divided Rome into 14 regions, the modern Regola belonged was included in the IX region called Circus Flaminius. In the Middle Ages it entered the fourth of the seven new ecclesiastic regions, even if at that time the limits of the rioni were not very clear.

Because of the very frequent floods of the river Tiber, the area was unhealthy and it was drained at the end of the Middle Ages.

In 1586, when rione Borgo was established, the number of the rioni increased to 14, and Regola became the 7th, with the name of Arenulae et Chacabariorum.

In 1875, after the walls to stop the floods of the Tiber were built, the look of the area changed completely, removing all the things that grew up close to the river during the centuries.

Though small, the rione contains many kinds of buildings: palaces, hospitals, churches, embassies, ancient prisons and poor houses.

Geography

Boundaries
To the north, Regola borders with Ponte (R. V), from which is separated by Via Bravaria, Vicolo della Scimia, Via delle Carceri and Via dei Banchi Vecchi; with Parione (R. VI), whose border is marked by Via dei Banchi Vecchi, Via del Pellegrino, Via dei Cappellari, Campo de' Fiori, Via dei Giubbonari; and with Sant'Eustachio (R. VIII), the boundary being outlined by Via dei Giubbonari, Piazza Benedetto Cairoli, Via Arenula and Via di Santa Maria del Pianto.

To the east, it borders with Sant'Angelo (R. XI), from which is separated by Via di Santa Maria del Pianto and Piazza delle Cinque Scole, up to the Tiber. The Tiber itself briefly outlines the boundary with Ripa (R. XII),alongside the Tiber Island.

Southward and westward, Regola borders with Trastevere (R. XIII), from which is separated by the stretch of the Tiber between Ponte Giuseppe Mazzini and Ponte Garibaldi.

Places of interest

Palaces and other buildings 
 Palazzo Cisterna, in Via Giulia.
 Palazzo Falconieri, in Via Giulia.
 Palazzo Farnese, in Piazza Farnese, seat of the French embassy.
 Palazzo Fusconi-Pighini, in Piazza Farnese.
 Palazzo Piacentini, in Via Arenula, seat of the Ministry of Justice.
 Palazzo del Monte di Pietà, in Piazza del Monte di Pietà.
 Palazzo Spada and Galleria Spada, in Piazza Capo di Ferro.

Churches 
 Sant'Eligio degli Orefici
 Santa Maria in Monticelli
 Santissima Trinità dei Pellegrini
 San Salvatore in Onda
 Santo Spirito dei Napoletani
 Santa Caterina da Siena a Via Giulia
 Santa Maria dell'Orazione e Morte
 Santi Giovanni Evangelista e Petronio
 San Paolo alla Regola
 San Tommaso ai Cenci
 Santa Maria del Pianto
 San Salvatore in Campo
 Santa Maria della Quercia
 Santa Brigida
 San Girolamo della Carità
 Santa Caterina della Rota
 San Tommaso di Canterbury
 Santa Maria in Monserrato degli Spagnoli
 Santa Lucia del Gonfalone

Education 
Public libraries in Regola include the Biblioteca Centrale dei Ragazzi.

References

External links

 History, maps and images of the rione

Regola